Amplectobelua (meaning "embracing beast") is an extinct genus of late Early Cambrian amplectobeluid radiodont, a group of stem arthropods that mostly lived as free-swimming predators during the first half of the Paleozoic Era.

Anatomy 
The body structures other than frontal appendages are only known from the type species  Amplectobelua symbrachiata. Like other radiodonts, Amplectobelua had a pair of jointed frontal appendages, a head covered by dorsal and lateral sclerites (the latter had been misinterpreted as huge eyes), a limbless body with dorsal gills (setal blades), and a series of flaps on both sides that extended along the length of its body. 

Amplectobelua had a specialized frontal appendage, in which it has a distinct 3-segmented shaft region and 12-segmented distal articulated region, and the spine on the fourth segment (first segment of distal articulated region) hooked forward to oppose the tip of the appendage, allowing it to grasp prey like a pincer. Amplectobelua had 11 pairs of body flaps in total, they are relatively elongated and straight in outline. The size of the flaps decrease posteriory, and each of their frontal margin have rows of vein-like structures (strengthening rays). The neck region have at least 3 pairs of slender, reduced anterior flaps. The trunk terminated with a pair of long furcae (streamers).

Amplectobelua shares a unique feature among radiodonts with Ramskoeldia, in having gnathobase-like structures (GLSs) underneath its neck region, at least 6, up to eight. They functioned like the gnathobases of arthropods, being able to rotate and move to shred prey. They were connected to reduced anterior flaps. Additionally, the mouth (oral cone) of Amplectobelua were interpreted as different from typical radiodont, lacking the typical Peytoia-style oral cone and possessing numerous flat tooth-plates with unclear, but possibly non-radial arrangement.

Species
Two species are known, Amplectobelua symbrachiata from the Chengjiang biota and Amplectobelua stephenensis from the later Burgess Shale. A. symbrachiata is known from complete specimens, while A. stephenensis is known only from isolated frontal appendages. A. stephenensis is more advanced, with the frontal appendages being more specialized for grasping: the fourth spine is larger and the spines on outer segments are reduced.

References

Fossil Museum

External links
 
 Anomalocaris Homepage

Cambrian arthropods
Maotianshan shales fossils
Anomalocaridids
Burgess Shale fossils
Cambrian genus extinctions